Apollo Hospitals, Visakhapatnam is a branch of the Apollo Group of Hospitals located in Visakhapatnam, Andhra Pradesh, India. The hospital serves the health needs of north coastal Andhra Pradesh and adjacent Odisha.

History

The multi-specialty 350 bedded hospital at Health City, Arilova, Visakhapatnam has been operational since 2016.  The hospital has a Trauma Care Team and Respiratory Rehabilitation Unit. The institute covers different branches of health care including neurosciences, orthopedics, cosmetic and plastic surgery, gastroenterology and liver clinics. Departments include cardiology, cardiovascular surgery, neurosurgery including thrombectomy, bariatric surgery, plastic surgery, critical care, obstetrics and gynecology, nephrology, urology, orthopedics, radiology, ENT, and organ transplant.

Services

Out patient clinic 
Out patient clinics are available from 8:00 am to 8:00 pm from Monday to Saturday .

Apollo pharmacy 
One Apollo pharmacy outlet is attached to the main hospital. It is a part of Apollo Hospitals.

Education and research 
AHERF hosts academic courses coupled with research in the field of healthcare.

References

External links
 List of hospitals in India
 Apollo Hospitals

Hospitals in Visakhapatnam
Apollo Hospitals
2016 establishments in Andhra Pradesh
Hospitals established in 2016